Donald William Smillie (September 13, 1910 — June 15, 1993) was a professional ice hockey player who played twelve games in the National Hockey League with the Boston Bruins during the 1933–34 season. The rest of his career, which lasted from 1933 to 1936, was spent in various minor leagues.

Smillie got the first of his two NHL goals on March 6, 1934 in Boston's 7-3 win over Toronto.

Career statistics

Regular season and playoffs

External links
 

1910 births
1993 deaths
Boston Bruins players
Boston Tigers (CAHL) players
Canadian ice hockey left wingers
London Tecumsehs players
Ontario Hockey Association Senior A League (1890–1979) players
Ice hockey people from Toronto
St. Louis Flyers (AHA) players
Syracuse Stars (IHL) players
Toronto Varsity Blues ice hockey players
Toronto Young Rangers players
Windsor Bulldogs (1929–1936) players